Split Second is a crime fiction novel written by American writer David Baldacci. This is the first novel in the King and Maxwell book series. The book was published on September 30, 2003, by Grand Central Publishing.

Plot
Michelle Maxwell has just wrecked her promising career at the Secret Service. Against her instincts, she let a presidential candidate out of her sight for the briefest moment and the man whose safety was her responsibility vanished into thin air.

Sean King knows how the younger agent feels. Eight years earlier, the hard-charging Secret Service agent allowed his attention to be diverted for a split second. And the candidate he was protecting was gunned down before his eyes. Now Michelle and Sean are about to see their destinies converge.

Drawn into a maze of lies, secrets, and deadly coincidences, the two discredited agents uncover a shocking truth: that the separate acts of violence that shattered their lives were really a long time in the making—and are a long way from over.

References

External links
Official website

2003 American novels
Novels by David Baldacci